Valery Vladimirovich Rozov (December 26, 1964 – November 11, 2017) was a Russian BASE jumper, who became known for jumping from the world's highest summits. He currently holds the record for highest BASE jump in the world.

Notable jumps 

22 July 2004 Rozov completed the first wingsuit BASE jump from Amin Brakk in Pakistan.

25 February 2008 Rozov made the first BASE jump from Cerro Torre in a wingsuit.

9 December 2010 Valery Rozov became the first person to climb and BASE jump from the  Ulvetanna Peak in Antarctica.

25 May 2012 Rozov made the first BASE jump from the summit of Shivling at an altitude of  wearing a wingsuit.

Using a specially-developed Red Bull wingsuit, he glided down to the Rongbuk glacier more than 1,000 meters below, setting a new world record for highest base jump.

Death 

According to members of his group, Rozov crashed into the side of the mountain. He was 52 years old.

See also
List of Mount Everest records
Didier Delsalle (Summited Everest with helicopter in 2005)

References

External links
 Rozov's official Red Bull page

1964 births
2017 deaths
Russian skydivers
Sports world record holders
BASE jumping deaths
Sportspeople from Nizhny Novgorod